The Rotes Höhenvieh is a breed of red cattle from the Central Uplands of Germany. It was created in 1985 as a merger of the few remaining examples of a number of closely similar regional breeds of upland red cattle. Reconstruction of the breed was made possible by the discovery of a stock of semen in a sperm bank. The name means "red upland cattle".

History

The mechanisation of agriculture in the years after the Second World War meant that the draught power of the traditional upland red cattle of the Central Uplands was no longer required. They became essentially useless, and by about 1980 had all but disappeared. Recovery of the breed was based on about 20 cows, not pure-bred but retaining some characteristics of the old breed, and on the rediscovery in the Zentralbesamungsstation or semen collection centre of Giessen, in Hesse, of about 60 doses of semen from a pure-bred bull.

Rotes Höhenvieh, was the first variety of German Red (ger. Deutsches Rotvieh) that adopted a recovery plan. Other local varieties of the combined German Red herdbook reasserting their identity were the Red Wittgenstein, of Siegen-Wittgenstein (North Rhine-Westphalia), the Bavarian Red, the Thuringian Red (ger. Thüringer Rotvieh), the Harz cattle (ger. Harzer Rotvieh) and the Vogtland cattle. Westerwald cattle and Kelheimer cattle got completely absorbed into German Red cattle. Their trace is lost.

Numbers of the Rotes Höhenvieh have risen steadily in recent years, from 387 in 1997 to 1521 in 2012. It was listed as "endangered" by the FAO in 2007, and is listed as "Category II: seriously endangered" on the Rote Liste or red list of the Gesellschaft zur Erhaltung alter und gefährdeter Haustierrassen. It was named the "endangered breed of the year" by the GEH in 1997.

Use

References

Cattle breeds originating in Germany
Animal breeds on the GEH Red List